A. fulgida may refer to:

 Acyphoderes fulgida, a longhorn beetle
 Aeschynomene fulgida, a legume with an aeschynomenoid root nodule
 Anachis fulgida, a dove snail
 Andrena fulgida, a mining bee
 Argia fulgida, a New World damselfly
 Arhopala fulgida, a blue butterfly